Iron Eagle: Original Motion Picture Soundtrack is the soundtrack for the TriStar Pictures film Iron Eagle, released on July 23, 1986 by Capitol Records. A separate film score by Basil Poledouris titled Iron Eagle: Original Motion Picture Score was released on July 9, 2008 by Varèse Sarabande.

The soundtrack itself peaked on the Billboard top 200 album chart at position #54 in late March, 1986, and features its only song that charted, "One Vision" by Queen, a minor hit pop single (position #61) on the Billboard Hot 100 and #19 hit on the Album Rock Tracks chart.

Iron Eagle: Original Motion Picture Soundtrack

Track listing

Not included in the album
The following songs were featured in the film, but not included in the soundtrack album:

"Old Enough to Rock and Roll" by Rainey Haynes
"Gimme Some Lovin'" by The Spencer Davis Group
"Eyes of the World" by Eric Martin
"We're Not Gonna Take It" by Twisted Sister
"Proud Mary" by Ike & Tina Turner
"There Was a Time" by James Brown

Music video
A music video for King Kobra's "Iron Eagle (Never Say Die)" was made to promote the film. The video features Louis Gossett Jr. reprising his role as Col. "Chappy" Sinclair, who has the band cut their hair and undergo boot camp training for them to prove themselves as pilots.

Iron Eagle: Original Motion Picture Score

Track listing

References

External links
Soundtrack
 
 
 

Score
 
 

Action film soundtracks
1986 soundtrack albums
Capitol Records soundtracks
Iron Eagle (film series)
Varèse Sarabande soundtracks